Triazenes are organic compounds that contain the functional group −N(R)−N=N− (where R is H, alkyl, aryl).  Some anti-cancer medications and dyes are triazenes. Formally, triazenes are related to the unstable triazene, H2N−N=NH.  The relationship is more theoretical than practical.

Production
Triazenes are prepared from the N-coupling reaction between diazonium salts and primary or secondary amines. Symmetrical triazenes, for example 1,3-diphenyltriazene (PhN=N−NHPh), are prepared by the partial diazotization of aromatic primary amines, aniline in this example, and the subsequent coupling reaction in the presence of sodium acetate. Asymmetrical triazenes, for example (phenyldiazenyl)pyrrolidine (PhN=N−NC4H8), are prepared from the N-coupling reaction between diazonium salts and secondary amines in presence of sodium carbonate or sodium bicarbonate.

Analogues of Tröger's base containing a symmetric pair of asymmetric triazene side-chains have been obtained similarly.

Tautomerism

Triazenes derived from primary amines engage in tautomerism.  In the case of symmetric triazenes, the tautomers are identical.

Reactions and applications
An important reaction of triazenes is their conversion to diazonium salts. Triazenes decompose in the presence of protonating or alkylating agents into quaternary amines and diazonium salts; as such triazenes have been used as an in situ source of diazonium that reacted with sodium sulfide to give the corresponding thiophenols. A strategy for the protection and deprotection of sensitive secondary amines is based on this principle.  

Polymeric triazenes are applied as conductive and absorbent materials. Triazenes have been used in the synthesis of cinnoline, functionalized lactams, and coumarins.

References

Functional groups